Joel Fallon (June 16, 1931 - August 11, 2016) was the first Poet laureate of Benicia, California. He is the namesake of the Joel Fallon poetry scholarship awarded annually since 2015 to high school students in Benicia, California. He was a founding member of the Benicia First Tuesday Poets, which meets at the Benicia Library monthly since 2003, and also helped begin the Benicia Love Poetry Contest and the annual Poets’ Picnic. He was named Benicia's first poet laureate in 2005. He helped Genea Brice advocate for a poet laureate program in neighboring Vallejo, California. He also served as a vice president of Arts Benicia. Fallon began writing poetry while serving overseas in the United States Army. He was influenced by Robert Frost, Emily Dickinson, and Charles Bukowski. His successors include Robert Shelby, Ronna Leon, Lois Requist, Don Peery, Johanna Ely, and Tom Stanton.

Works

Collections
Peery, Don, ed. The Book of Joel (Benicia Literary Arts, 2019)

Chapbooks
Apple Wind
A Gathering of Angels
Clean Sheets, Dirty Woman
Shanghai Wilson

Albums
Fallon Reads Fallon (2010)

See also 

 Robert Shelby
 List of municipal poets laureate in California

References

Municipal Poets Laureate in the United States
Poets from California
People from Benicia, California
21st-century American male writers
American male poets
1931 births
21st-century American poets
2016 deaths